is a former Japanese football player and manager.

Playing career
Sato was born in Takasaki on June 27, 1974. After graduating from University of Tsukuba, he joined J1 League club Yokohama Flügels in 1997. He played many matches as right side midfielder and right side back. The club won the 2nd place 1997 Emperor's Cup and the champions 1998 Emperor's Cup. However the club was disbanded end of 1998 season due to financial strain, he moved to Yokohama F. Marinos in 1999. In 2000, he moved to Kyoto Purple Sanga. However the club was relegated to J2 League end of 2000 season. In 2001, he moved to J2 club Oita Trinita. In 2002, he moved to Yokohama F. Marinos again. Although the club won the champions in 2003 J1 League, he could not play many matches in 2 seasons. In 2004, he moved to Sanfrecce Hiroshima. However he could hardly play in the match. In 2005, he moved to J2 club Yokohama FC was founded by Yokohama Flügels supporters. Although he played many matches, his opportunity to play decreased in late 2005 season and he retired end of 2005 season.

Club statistics

References

External links

1974 births
Living people
University of Tsukuba alumni
Association football people from Gunma Prefecture
Japanese footballers
J1 League players
J2 League players
Yokohama Flügels players
Yokohama F. Marinos players
Kyoto Sanga FC players
Oita Trinita players
Sanfrecce Hiroshima players
Yokohama FC players
Association football midfielders